Potassium/sodium hyperpolarization-activated cyclic nucleotide-gated channel 4 is a protein that in humans is encoded by the HCN4 gene.

There are four HCN channels. HCN4 is prominently expressed in the pace maker region of the mammalian heart. Some humans with bradycardia and Sick sinus syndrome have been shown to have mutations in their HCN4 gene. The role of HCN channels in autonomic control of heart rate is currently a matter of ongoing investigation.

Interactions 

HCN4 has been shown to interact with HCN2.

See also 
 Cyclic nucleotide-gated ion channel
 Funny current

References

Further reading

External links 
  GeneReviews/NIH/NCBI/UW entry on Brugada syndrome
 
 
 

Ion channels